Herbert F. Maddalene, AIA, (born January 28, 1928), was an American architect who practiced in the mid to late-twentieth-century New York, New Jersey, and Massachusetts, as a partner in the  under the architectural firm name Genovese & Maddalene.

Personal life
Born in Jersey City, New Jersey, he earned his Bachelor of Architecture degree from the Carnegie Institute of Technology in 1952, where he was a member of Tau Sigma Delta. In 1970, he lived at 16 Vermont Drive, Paramus, New Jersey 07652. he lived in Ridgewood, New Jersey in the late 1970s.

Architectural career
Maddalene joined the New Jersey Society of Architects, American Institute of Architects, in 1960, and was registered to practice in New York, New Jersey, Massachusetts, and Illinois. He was a member of the AIA American Institute of Architects Hudson chapter, and its president in 1958. With Anthony V. Genovese, Herbert F. Maddalene  established his firm of Genovese & Maddalene at 175 Rock Rd, Glen Rock, New Jersey 07452 in 1963.

Works as Genovese &. Maddalene
1967: Church of the Holy Name of Jesus (Rochester, New York)
1968: Advent Lutheran Church (Wyckoff, New Jersey)
1969: Our Lady of Good Counsel Church (Staten Island, New York)
1969: Our Lady of Mt. Carmel Church (Staten Island, New York)
1969: Church of the Nativity (Manhattan)

References

1928 births
Defunct architecture firms based in New Jersey
Architecture firms based in New Jersey
Architects from New Jersey
Artists from Jersey City, New Jersey
People from Paramus, New Jersey
People from Ridgewood, New Jersey
American ecclesiastical architects
Architects of Roman Catholic churches
Architects of Lutheran churches
Modernist architects
Living people